Schopfheim-Schlattholz station is a railway station in the municipality of Schopfheim, in Baden-Württemberg, Germany. It is located on standard gauge Wiese Valley Railway of Deutsche Bahn. The station opened on 9 December 2017. An infill station, it was built at a cost of 1.4 million euros, shared between the city and the Basel Commuter Fund (Pendlerfonds Basel). The stop is handicap-accessible, and includes a -long side platform with shelters and ticket vending machines.

Services
 the following services stop at Schopfheim-Schlattholz:

 Basel S-Bahn:

References

External links
 

Railway stations in Baden-Württemberg
Buildings and structures in Lörrach (district)
Railway stations in Germany opened in 2017